Rubicon Township may refer to several places in the United States:

 Rubicon Township, Greene County, Illinois
 Rubicon Township, Huron County, Michigan

See also

Rubicon (disambiguation)

Township name disambiguation pages